"Places" is a song recorded, written, and produced by Greek DJ Xenia Ghali, featuring vocals by singer-songwriter Raquel Castro. The track became Ghali's second single to reach number one on the Billboard Dance Club Songs chart in its May 6, 2017 issue.

Track listing
Single
"Places" (featuring Raquel Castro) [radio edit] – 3:07   
Remix
"Places" (extended mix) – 4:31
Remixes Part 2
"Places" (X.G. Remix) 
"Places" (Belocca's Space Remix) 
"Places" (Gamechasers Remix) 
"Places" (Chunks Remix) 
"Places" (Casey Alva Remix)

Charts

References

External links
Official video at YouTube

2016 songs
2017 singles
Electronic songs
House music songs
Songs written by Xenia Ghali